Best friends forever describes a close social relationship.

Best friends forever may also refer to:

 Best Friends Forever (film), a 2013 American female buddy road comedy film
 Best Friends Forever (American TV series), an American sitcom television series
 Best Friends Forever (Indonesian TV series), an Indonesian teen drama mystery thriller television series
 Best Friends Forever?, an Indian teen drama television series
 "Best Friends Forever" (South Park), an episode of the American animated television series South Park
 BFF: Best Friends Forever, a 2009 Filipino comedy film
 "Best Friends Forever", a 2001 song by Tweenies

See also
 BFF (disambiguation)